The 1976 WTA Tour consisted of a number of tennis tournaments for female tennis players. It was composed of the newly streamlined version of the Virginia Slims Circuit, was now an 11-week tour of the United States, and the Woman's International Grand Prix. The 1976 tour was the first full season using the official ranking system and these rankings were used to determine acceptance into the tournaments.

Schedule 
This is a calendar of all events which were part of either the Virginia Slims circuit or the Women's International Grand Prix in the year 1976, with player progression documented from the quarterfinals stage. Also included are the Grand Slam tournaments, the 1976 Virginia Slims Championships, the 1976 Federation Cup and a number of events not affiliated with either tour.

Key

January

February

March

April

May

June

July

August

September

October

November

Rankings 
Below are the 1976 WTA year-end rankings (December 31, 1976) Singles competition:

See also 
 1976 Men's Grand Prix circuit

References

External links 
 Women's Tennis Association (WTA) official website
 International Tennis Federation (ITF) official website

 
WTA Tour
WTA Tour seasons